Théophile Speicher (12 August 1909 — 6 August 1982) was a Luxembourgish footballer who played as a forward. Born in Hesperange, he represented CA Spora Luxembourg.

Speicher made 18 appearances for the Luxembourg national team, and scored six goals. He made his debut on 1 June 1930 in a 7–4 friendly loss to Belgium, in Bruges, and scored his first two goals in a 6–3 loss to the same opponents in Charleroi. He played two matches in 1934 FIFA World Cup qualification, scoring in a 6–1 home loss to France. 

He was called up for the 1936 Olympics, but did not play, with Luxembourg beaten 9–0 by hosts Germany in the first round.

References

1909 births
1982 deaths
Association football forwards
Luxembourgian footballers
Luxembourg international footballers
People from Hesperange
CA Spora Luxembourg players
Footballers at the 1936 Summer Olympics
Olympic footballers of Luxembourg